Gowro, also known as Gabaro, is an Indo-Aryan language spoken in Kohistan District, Pakistan.

References

Dardic languages